Fort Kearny may refer to:

Fort Kearny, a historic fort in Nebraska
Fort Phil Kearny, a historic fort in Wyoming
Fort Kearny (Washington, D.C.), a historic fort in Washington, D.C.
Fort Kearny (Rhode Island), a historic fort in Narragansett, Rhode Island (often misspelled Fort Kearney)
Camp Kearny, a former Army and Navy base in San Diego, California